John-Michael Hakeem Gibson (born August 15, 1990), better known by his stage name Cash Out (stylized Ca$h Out), is an American rapper originally from Columbus, Georgia, but later raised in Atlanta. He first became known for his semi-eponymous debut single with Epic Records, "Cashin' Out", which peaked at number 36 on the Billboard Hot 100 in 2011. His debut album Let's Get It, was released on August 26, 2014, and was preceded by the lead single "She Twerkin".

Career 
In 2009, he was acquitted from a gun charge in Clayton County, Georgia: he felt he had been given a second chance in life, so he turned his attentions towards advancing his career as a rapper. He initially signed to the independent record label Bases Loaded and released the single "Cashin' Out", which later appeared on his debut mixtape, titled It's My Time. After Epic Records label head L.A. Reid heard "Cashin' Out", he requested a meeting with Gibson to ask him to sign to the label: Gibson performed a song titled "Smilin' In My Face" during the interview, which convinced Reid to sign him to Epic.

Following its re-release through Epic Records in March 2012, "Cashin' Out" achieved significant commercial success in the United States, peaking at number 36 on the US Billboard Hot 100, also reaching the runner-up spot on the Hot R&B/Hip-Hop Songs chart and topping the Hot Rap Songs chart. The song's success has inspired many freestyles and remixes by other rappers, including Ludacris, Krayzie Bone Da Brat, Bow Wow, Roscoe Dash, c-command, Young Jeezy, Akon, Chief Keef, Fabolous and Yo Gotti, the latter four of whom appear on the song's official remix. A follow-up single, "Big Booty", was released to digital retailers on July 31, 2012. In May 2013, his new single "Another Country" was released with Future on the track.

2014-present: Signing with eOne Music & Let's Get It 
In 2014, Cash Out signed a deal with E1 Music and released the single "She Twerkin" in February 2014. It debuted on the Hot 100 at the last spot, making it his second chart entry. Cash Out's debut album Let's Get It (formerly titled Patience) was released on August 26, 2014.

In 2019, he made an appearance as himself in the film Uncut Gems starring Adam Sandler and Lakeith Stanfield.

Discography

Studio albums

Mixtapes

Singles

Guest appearances

Music videos

References

1990 births
African-American male rappers
American male rappers
Epic Records artists
Living people
Rappers from Atlanta
Southern hip hop musicians
21st-century American rappers
21st-century American male musicians
21st-century African-American musicians